1971 college football season may refer to:

 1971 NCAA University Division football season
 1971 NCAA College Division football season
 1971 NAIA Division I football season
 1971 NAIA Division II football season